Grace Ernestine Hall Hemingway ( Hall; June 15, 1872 – June 28, 1951) was an American opera singer, music teacher, and painter. She was Ernest Hemingway's mother.

Early life 

Grace Ernestine Hall was born on June 15, 1872 in Chicago. She was the daughter of wealthy merchant Ernest Miller Hall (1840—1905) and Caroline Hancock (1843—1895), both natives of England. Ernest M. Hall had immigrated to America in 1855, and had fought during the American Civil War, serving as a Corporal in Company L, 1st Iowa Cavalry from September 1861 to August 1862.  A younger brother, Leicester, was born in 1874. Hall studied the violin, piano and took voice lessons when she was young. In 1886, her family moved to Oak Park, where she attended Oak Park High School and first encountered her future husband, Clarence Edmonds 'Ed' Hemingway (1871—1928).

In 1889, Caroline and Ernest Hall purchased a lot on North Oak Park Avenue. While living in a rental house nearby, the couple supervised construction of their new home, designed by architect Wesley Arnold. The Hall house was completed in 1890 and located at 449 Oak Park Avenue The Victorian 3-story house, just across the street from the Hemingway family house, consisted of first and second floors with six bedrooms and a bathroom. Their home had running water and was the first house in Oak Park to have electricity.

Hall and Clarence Hemingway became close friends during her mother's illness from cancer in 1894. Hemingway was the new medical assistant to the Hall's family doctor, Dr. William Lewis, and made frequent house calls to visit Caroline Hall, during which he was a source of emotional support for Grace as her mother's health deteriorated. Caroline Hall died on September 5, 1895. By then, Hall and Hemingway's friendship had grown into a romantic relationship.
 
In the fall of 1895, Hall went to New York City to study with Luiza Cappiani—a well-known opera coach—and, in 1896, she debuted as a talented contralto with the Apollo-Club in Madison Square Garden. She was later offered a contract by the Metropolitan Opera but turned it down for two reasons: her eyes, weakened from a childhood illness, could not tolerate the bright stage lighting, and she was also greatly influenced by Hemingway's many letters, imploring her to return to Oak Park.

Family and career 

On October 1, 1896, Hall married Clarence Hemingway. The couple moved into Ernest Hall's large home. At the time of her marriage, Hall Hemingway had over fifty voice pupils and gave music and voice lessons, wrote sheet music, and directed the children's church choir and the orchestra at the First Congregational Church of Oak Park. She also sang in concerts and was a soloist with the church choir. She earned quite a bit more money from her music lessons than her husband did as a doctor. According to her daughter, Marcelline, she was earning up to $1000 a month at one point, while her husband, just starting out in his profession, was bringing in $50 a month.

The Hall house is the birthplace of the three oldest Hemingway children: Marcelline in 1898, Ernest in 1899, and Ursula in 1902.  Madelaine (Sunny) was born in 1904 at their Walloon Lake cottage in Michigan. All the Hemingway children were delivered by their father. Their mother did not participate in the domestic chores in the Hemingway household but their father often cooked, planned meals, helped with laundry and did seasonal canning. Live-in maids and nannies performed most of the housekeeping, cooking and care of the children.  

Hall Hemingway focused her maternal energy on encouraging and inspiring her children in the cultural world of literature, art, poetry and music. She read hundreds of books to her children when they were young, and taught them songs and poetry. She took her children to the opera, theater, and museums in nearby Chicago. She insisted that all of her children learn to play a musical instrument. The girls were encouraged to play the violin and piano, and Ernest was assigned the cello. The Hemingway family would spend their summers at their family cottage in Walloon Lake, Michigan. Their father was an excellent outdoorsman who introduced the Hemingway children to swimming, camping, fishing, hiking, and hunting. Their mother enjoyed their summer trips, was often outdoors with the family, and was comfortable using both a fishing pole and a rifle. She would later design and have built a small cottage across the lake from the main cottage. She often would row herself from the large family cottage to the smaller cottage to spend a few quiet days on her own.

Ernest's grandfather died in May 1905, leaving his home to his daughter, Grace. By October, she had sold the house to Samuel Nissen, an Oak Park grocer. She bought a lot on Kenilworth avenue and made sketches for a new, much larger house. With those sketches, the architect designed a three-story, eight-bedroom stucco home for the family, with a large music studio for herself and an office for her husband to see medical patients. Their last two children were born at the new house: Carol in 1911 and Leicester in 1915, when she was forty-two years old.

Grace and Ernest 

Ernest Hemingway had a difficult relationship with his mother, beginning in his teen years. She asserted her authority over every Hemingway family member, including her husband. She put many demands on her children, insisting they participate in activities that were important to her. As Ernest matured as a young man, he often chafed under her rules, intent on exploring sports, hobbies and activities that interested him. He started refusing to do as she bade, which caused a lot of conflict between mother and son. Furthermore, Clarence was often away from home, for long periods of time, and his depression caused him to withdraw from the family, which made things even more difficult for Ernest during his teens. 
 
Writers, historians, and Ernest's friends have discussed his difficult relationship with his mother at length. Bernice Kert states: "It has also been said that Ernest's lifelong assertion of masculine power grew out of his emotional need to exorcise the painful memory of his mother asserting her superiority over his father." Major General Charles Lanham, a friend of Ernest's, said that he was the only man he ever knew who really hated his mother.

Later years 
Hall Hemingway was an active member of the Suburban Civics and Equal Suffrage Club in Oak Park, during the era of the New Woman movement (1890–1920), with women's suffrage as a national issue.

In 1924, at the age of 52, she began to paint and attended classes at the Art Institute of Chicago and other art schools. She studied art for two years. In an interview in the April 1937 issue of  Artistry Magazine, she claimed to have painted over 600 pictures, mainly landscapes. Hall Hemingway belonged to the Oak Park Art League, serving as its director for six years.

Clarence Hemingway suffered from deteriorating health in the 1920s, both physical and mental. He died from a self-inflicted gunshot wound in 1928. Ernest blamed his mother for his death. According to author John Raeburn, "In the Hemingway household, her imperious presence and propensity for self-dramatization contrasted with her husband's irritable remoteness. Ernest, frightened by his father's bewildering behavior, identified its cause as his mother's overbearingness. That was unjust, but he never relinquished the conviction, and it echoed in several of his stories."

Hall Hemingway was fifty-six at the time of her husband's death, but still had two children to support and educate, Carol and Leicester. She rented out part of her home to help pay for Carol's education. Ernest and his second wife, Pauline, set up a trust fund for his mother to help support her for the remainder of her life. In gratitude for his generosity, she deeded the family's summer cottage to Ernest.

Learning to drive for the first time, Hall Hemingway took driving trips to Florida, to sketch and paint. She sold her large home in 1936 and moved into a smaller home in the nearby village of River Forest. She carried on painting and began teaching painting lessons, while still teaching voice lessons for several years.

Hall Hemingway lived for twenty-three years on her own after her husband's death. She died in Memphis, Tennessee, in 1951. She was buried alongside Clarence at Forest Home Cemetery in Forest Park, Illinois.

Notes

References

Sources

Books

Websites

Further reading

External links 

Hemingway family
1872 births
1951 deaths
People from Chicago
19th-century American women opera singers
American operatic contraltos
American women painters
Singers from Illinois
Classical musicians from Illinois